Whitlash is an unincorporated community in northwestern Liberty County, Montana, United States, about five miles south of the province of Alberta across the Canada–US border.

Whitlash has a post office and an elementary school that provides educational services in grades prekindergarten through 8. The community is accessible only by unpaved road.  The Whitlash Border Crossing is about five miles to the north. As of 2014, Whitlash, with the zip code of 59545, had a population of 35 people. Since 2000, it has had a population growth of 133.33 percent.

Whitlash is located near the East Butte of the Sweet Grass Hills which are major historic and physical landmarks of the Great Plains. Sacred to the American Indians, "The Hills" served as hunting grounds, battlegrounds, spiritual grounds, and of course were used for navigational purposes as well.

The post office opened in 1892. The post office moved 6 times, until Alfred and Tom Strode laid out a townsite on Half Breed Creek in 1905. U.S. Customs operated out of the town from 1933 until 1969, when it was moved to the actual border.

Demographics

See also
 Whitlash-Aden Border Crossing

References

External links
 Photos of Whitlash, Montana

Unincorporated communities in Liberty County, Montana
Unincorporated communities in Montana